Mariakani–Kaloleni–Mavueni Road is a road in Kenya, connecting the towns of Mariakani to Kaloleni and Mavueni, all in Kilifi County, Kenya.

Location

Overview
This road, is an important transport corridor for farmers, tourists and investors. It forms an alternative entry into Tsavo National Park for tourists from Kenya's north coast. It is classified as a Class C Road by the Kenya National Highway Authority. The road is prone to flooding during the rainy season.

Upgrade and funding
Beginning circa 2006, the government of Kenya, through Kenya National Highway Authority began upgrading this road from bitumen surface to class II bitumen with shoulders, culverts and drainage channels. Sometime prior to February 2016, the Mariakani to Kaloleni section was upgraded to bitumen surface. The ongoing upgrade of the Kaloleni to Mavueni section, is expected to conclude later in 2016. Work is contracted to MuljiDevraj & Brothers Limited at a contract price of KSh 2.3 billion (approx. US$231 million), fully funded by the Kenyan government. *Note: US$1.00 = KSh99.58 on 7 April 2016

See also
 List of roads in Kenya

References

External links
 Webpage of the Kenya National Highway Authority

Roads in Kenya
Geography of Kenya
Transport in Kenya
Kilifi County